James McNeece (24 December 1885 – 21 June 1917) was a New Zealand rugby union player. A forward, McNeece represented  at a provincial level, and was a member of the New Zealand national side, the All Blacks, in 1913 and 1914. He played 11 matches for the All Blacks including five internationals. He served as a private with  2nd Battalion, Otago Regiment, New Zealand Expeditionary Force, during World War I, and died in hospital of wounds received during the Battle of Messines.

References

1885 births
1917 deaths
Rugby union players from Invercargill
New Zealand rugby union players
New Zealand international rugby union players
Southland rugby union players
Rugby union forwards
New Zealand military personnel killed in World War I
New Zealand Army soldiers
New Zealand Military Forces personnel of World War I